Coursehorn is a hamlet located immediately to the east of the village of Cranbrook in Kent, England.  It is the site of the local cemetery; and Dulwich Preparatory School (DCPS), which despite the name is not connected with Dulwich College in London, but is connected with Dulwich College Preparatory School in London.

The Old Cloth Hall, showing Cranbrook's medieval importance to the wool industry, is also located in Coursehorn. The Old Cloth Hall is listed Grade II* on the National Heritage List for England.

References 

Villages in Kent